Fennell Hill, also known as Cox Site and Milberry Site, is a historic archaeological site located near Peeples, Allendale County, South Carolina. It is a formative shell midden on the Savannah River measuring about 96 meters long by about 48 meters in width.  The midden contains large quantities of fiber-tempered and Thom's Creek pottery—both examples of the earliest pottery found in the southeast.

It was added to the National Register of Historic Places in 1974.

References

Archaeological sites on the National Register of Historic Places in South Carolina
National Register of Historic Places in Allendale County, South Carolina